The Frame is a 2014 American science fiction film, written and directed by Jamin Winans and starring David Carranza and Tiffany Mualem. It was produced by Winans's own independent production company, Double Edge Films, with Kiowa K. Winans, and shot by cinematographer Robert Muratore in locations around Denver, Colorado.  It is the follow up to the 2009 science fiction fantasy film Ink, also written and directed by Jamin Winans.  The Frame played at the 2015 Sitges Film Festival in Spain, the 2015 Imagine Film Festival in Amsterdam and the 2015 Fantaspoa Film Festival in Brazil.

Plot 

Alex (David Carranza), a methodical cargo thief working for a dangerous cartel, narrowly escapes arrest after an elaborate semi-truck heist is reduced to a foot chase in the opening scene. Alex plans ahead and disappears into a crowd to avoid capture.

Sam (Tiffany Mualem), an empathetic and tough paramedic, pulls up to a scene of domestic violence and runs into the house before cops arrive. Sam manages to save a battered woman and protect herself and the daughter from a belligerent husband. Clearly rattled by her day job and trying to reconcile seeing pain every day, Sam visits her therapist and talks about her wish to make everything better but recognizes the futility.

Home after collecting his pay for the recent heist, Alex stashes it in a hidden wall safe and turns on the TV to eat dinner. He watches intently a television show, which happens to be the scene with Sam the paramedic we just saw happening in real time. Sam is the star of the show, called Urban Hope.

Sam, home after her therapist visit, sits eating dinner in front of the TV and watches Alex's recent heist and escape with the intensity of a true fan. Alex's show is called Thieves and Saints.

Late one evening, as the two have their televisions on, they realize that they are each broadcast live from their living rooms on the other's TV set. They say hello, panic, and turn off their TVs. Each handles the impossibility in a different way – Sam tells her therapist she may be losing her mind, and Alex believes the cartel or cops have him under surveillance.

Alex visits his mentor Noah (Cal Bartlett) who is sick and elderly but who seems to be the only person Alex has in the world. Noah senses Alex is in danger, reminds him he's living in a dark world of his own creation, and sends him home with the violin Alex played as a child. Alex is reluctant to take the violin as it is a reminder of something painful in his past – a clue we received when he accidentally almost ruined a photo of himself with his parents and the violin as a young boy.

Alex and Sam continue to see each other randomly through their televisions and attempt to unwind the mystery by setting a meeting point at her apartment and later at a bridge. Both are met with bizarre interactions: Alex's Cartel Boss shows up in one form on the bridge in his world; Sam's Therapist shows up in another form on the bridge in her world and in front of her apartment as a dark character riding a bizarre black tar-spewing bicycle. We realize these characters are one and the same, crossing the boundaries between their worlds and morphing into different forms. We also realize that Sam and Alex have the additional connection of music between the two worlds – Sam hums a beautiful melody from the bridge and Alex taps his hand to the same count and we see a mysterious vibration around them.

The violin that Noah gave to Alex keeps appearing in Alex's apartment, but Alex wishes to make it go away so he repeatedly puts it away in the closet. Back out again on a moving box, the camera pans across the room and knocks the violin off the box with the left frame line. There is definitely some kind of surveillance happening in Alex's world but it isn't the cartel or the cops. Something else is watching him.

The menacing Therapist, Cartel Boss and Black Tar Mechanic characters (all played by Christopher Soren Kelly) continue to distract and prevent them each from believing that the connection on the television is legitimate. Alex has one last heist to pull and Sam sees that his show is ending – that the advertised Season Finale of Thieves and Saints is the final heist. Sam pleads with Alex not to go on the heist, that she doesn't know what will happen to him and perhaps there is a fate worse than being caught by the cops or killed by the cartel. Sam wonders if there is a writer to his show – is some production company in charge of both of their stories? Alex fires back, angry at the idea that a writer would write him such a horrific life. Sam says either everything is chaos or everything is a miracle. Alex is certain everything is chaos. On a hunch, Sam researches the Thieves and Saints production company website.

The final heist in Thieves and Saints has Alex gunning down most of his crew to save an innocent bystander family. Alex takes a shot to the gut in the shootout as Sam watches panicked at her TV. Alex stumbles home and sees her on his TV and she pleads with him to call an ambulance. He fears being caught, he thinks the cartel are everywhere and he is content to die with the connection to Sam from his apartment. Knowing he doesn't have much longer, Sam asks Alex to hum a melody with her. It's the same melody she was humming at the bridge and as Alex joins in, both of their worlds begin to vibrate. Alex weakens, takes his final breath and Sam sits stunned pleading with him not to leave her.

She springs into action, remembering she had found the Thieves and Saints production company address, and drives there, only to be stopped by her therapist, who has been looking for her, fearing she is not mentally well. She runs past him into the building and to the floor of the Thieves and Saints writer's office. A 60s-dressed secretary sits in a small lobby staring at a phone and asks how Sam is doing. Sam goes through the only door in the room and finds herself in an empty room – on one side extending to infinite black and the other with spools feeding into a typing machine. She exits the other side which takes her back into the secretary's office and she has the same short conversation as if on a repeating loop.

Finally she summons the courage to walk toward the typing machine in the empty room and sees a projection image above the machine showing Alex on the floor of his apartment. The typing machine deposits the final page for “Thieves and Saints: Episode 50”. Sam picks up the script and flips through, seeing everything that had happened up to this point in his show. Sam is able to write onto the script and change Alex's fate, reviving him from death. Changing the script sets off a cascade of changing events that Sam struggles to keep up with as she drives through the city to escape her persistent therapist.

Humming her favorite melody nervously and paying more attention to the script than the road, Sam's car is hit by oncoming traffic and spun around. In her final desperate attempt to save Alex from his ever-changing script, she burns it. Shortly thereafter another car crashes into her and kills her.

At that moment, everyone in Alex's world disintegrates into black tar and the traffic, noise, and activity come to a halt. Alex sits catatonic for a few moments then walks around the vacant city in wonder. He passes by an antique shop with an old television playing Sam's show and he sees her car accident and final demise. As he's reeling from her death, he turns around to find Sam's Therapist morph from the TV into the Black Tar Mechanic standing right behind him. The Mechanic delivers a bizarre speech – beginning with 'all that was left was the man and the devil, trapped in the writer's creation.' Alex realizes he is in fact written and that the only person left in the world with him is the devil. The devil is determined to erase the world with his black tar machine, with or without Alex in it.

Alex returns home with earlier scenes from Sam's show playing on a loop. He wanders the city a bit, always aware there is something over his shoulder watching him. Out of paranoia he looks back but sees nothing. He is despondent, exhausts his remaining food and is entirely alone but for Sam's reruns and a massive, ugly machine spewing black tar into the sky and blocking out the sun. He sees that Sam burned his script. This gives him the idea to do the same – what if he could find the writer's office too?

Alex arrives in the same strange secretary's room at the production company; it is vacant. No signs of life anywhere. Alex opens the door to the empty room and hears typing at the far end. As he walks toward the sound of the typewriter, he sees a projection of himself in that moment repeating into infinity. He turns back and stares directly into the camera – aware for the first time that the camera is the entity who is watching him. He approaches the typewriter and sees a full script sitting in the paper tray called 'The Frame'. The script describes the exact moment we're seeing, Alex becoming aware of the script and storyteller and writer. He stumbles backward in disbelief and the left side of the camera frame hits him in the back. He moves in the opposite direction and finds the other side of The Frame. After challenging both sides, The Frame lifts him up and tilts him backwards and he mysteriously wakes up at home.

Contemplating his encounter with this mysterious force, he draws a square, then two arrows: one pointing left and one pointing right toward both edges. He then pokes a hole through the paper and realizes he needs to run away from the camera, not toward the edges.

Alex, finally ready to test fate and his entrapment, jumps out of his third-story window. The Frame catches him gracefully at the bottom of the picture, preventing his death. Alex runs and The Frame pursues him at every turn – Alex smashes into the edges of The Frame. He is angrily reliving his childhood, in which his parents were murdered and his prayer for help went unanswered. He tells the writer to fuck off – that the writer left him all alone. The writer wrote him a cruel and lonely life and made him do terrible things. Alex heaves his anger one final time at The Frame and passes out on the street. Gently The Frame picks him up and carries him home.

Alex again wakes up in his apartment as The Mechanic is closing in on his promise to black out the world. Sam's final episode is still replaying on his TV – she is being pursued by her Therapist and hums nervously while she drives and changes Alex's script. With nothing left to do but surrender, Alex finally reaches for his violin. As he plays, the melody of her humming and his strings combine to merge their two worlds. Alex swings the final note from the intersection in her world which sends the car which had run into and killed her, flying over her instead, leaving her safe.

Stunned to see him kneeling on the intersection where she burned his script, she approaches him with disbelief. Sam slowly walks up to him and places her hand warmly on his head. Alex bows in relief. For the first time in the film, The Frame pans off both characters and blurs to white.

Cast

Inspirations and themes 
Winans told an interviewer for Fast Cheap Movie Thoughts: "Ultimately I wanted to make a movie about the feeling of being abandoned by God. I wanted to explore the questions of God's existence, God's nature (benevolent or malevolent) and how we struggle between control and submission. The writing process for me always starts with images. I'll get an image of a moment and begin asking questions. Those questions eventually lead me to knowing the character and what brought him/her to that moment. With The Frame there were two primary images I started with: a man physically fighting to get out of a cage, and the man picking up a violin. I work for months (if not years) on an extensive outline and then write the actual script fairly quickly."In the same interview, Winans had this to say about the process of writing the score for the film:"I usually start working on the music at the script phase. The music helps me write and the writing helps me compose. With The Frame I composed about 75% of it before we started shooting and I was able to use that on set for key moments. Then, in the edit, I bounced back and forth between cutting and tweaking the music."

Reception 
Film School Rejects gave the film a B+ rating, with Chief Film Critic Rob Hunter writing:Like Christopher Nolan on a budget, writer/director Jamin Winans (Ink) creates worlds where imagination and emotion trump logic and traditional cohesion. That’s not a criticism of either man’s talents — instead it’s just to say that both place a high premium on the way their films make us feel and the ideas we’re left to mull over in our minds once the credits have rolled. Winans’ latest film, The Frame, continues that theme as it presents viewers with a beautiful, sci-fi tinged love story fueled by fate, forgiveness and wonder.Jason Heller, writing for Westword in an extensive interview and review writes:The Frame turns out to be a marvel. It's not anything like Ink, but the vibe is the same: Normal people full of everyday dreams, faults and fears suddenly have their foundation of reality yanked out from under them. How they cope with that crisis is not only intellectually challenging, it's emotionally devastating.

External links 
 Official Website
 The Frame at the Internet Movie Database

References 

2014 films
American science fiction films
Films shot in Colorado
2014 science fiction films
2010s English-language films
2010s American films